Willa of Burgundy ( – after 936) was a member of the Elder House of Welf. By birth she was a daughter of Rudolph I of Burgundy, king of Upper Burgundy. Through marriage Boso Willa became countess of Avignon and Arles, and then margravine of Tuscany.

Family
Willa’s parents were Rudolph I of Burgundy, king of Upper Burgundy and Willa of Provence, daughter of Boso of Provence. Willa’s siblings included Adelaide, wife of Emperor Louis the Blind, and Rudolph II of Burgundy, who succeeded their father as king of Burgundy. After Willa’s father’s death in 912, her mother married Hugh of Italy.

Marriage
In 912 Willa married Boso, count of Arles and Avignon. Boso was the son of Theobald of Arles and Bertha, a daughter of King Lothair II. His older brother, Hugh of Italy, was married to Willa’s mother. 
In 926, when Hugh became king of Italy, he made Boso regent of Provence.  
According to Liutprand of Cremona, at Willa’s and Boso’s urging, in 931 Hugh accused his half-brother Lambert of Tuscany of conspiring against him, and deposed him. Hugh invested his brother Boso as margrave of Tuscany in Lambert’s place, and Willa became margravine of Tuscany. 
According to Liutprand of Cremona, Willa’s ambition led Boso to rebel against Hugh in 936. Willa was sent into Burgundy, and Hugh replaced Boso as margrave of Tuscany with his own son, Hubert.

Willa’s date of death is not known.

Children
With Boso, Willa had several children, including:
Willa of Tuscany
Bertha, who married Boso, count of Burgundy, and Raymond II of Rouergue
Richilda
Gisela

Notes

References
Bouchard, Constance Brittain (1999), 'Burgundy and Provence, 879–1032', in Reuter, Timothy; McKitterick, Rosamond. The New Cambridge Medieval History, c.900-c.1024. Volume 3. Cambridge University Press.
 Keller, Hagen (1971). ‘Bosone di Toscana’, Dizionario Biografico degli Italiani. 13. Rome: Istituto dell'Enciclopedia Italiana
Jackman, Donald C. (2008). Ius hereditarium Encountered II: Approaches to Reginlint. Editions Enlaplage.
 Wickham, Chris (1981). Early Medieval Italy: Central Power and Local Society, 400–1000. London: Macmillan

Elder House of Welf
Margraves of the Holy Roman Empire
10th-century Italian women
Women from Burgundy
Daughters of kings
900 births
10th-century deaths
Year of birth uncertain
Year of death missing